Tina Marie Wesson (born December 26, 1960) is an American nurse, motivational speaker, and reality TV personality who won $1,000,000 as the winner of the second season of Survivor, on Survivor: The Australian Outback in 2001. Wesson returned in 2004 for Survivor: All-Stars, where she was the first person voted off the show. After her appearances on the show, Wesson began teaching occasional outdoor survival classes. Wesson returned as a contestant on the show's 27th season, Survivor: Blood vs. Water with her daughter, Katie Collins. Her daughter finished in eighth place while Wesson ended the season in fourth place.

Survivor

The Australian Outback

Wesson's first appearance on Survivor was in the show's second season, Survivor: The Australian Outback. As part of the Ogakor tribe, Wesson was not targeted in the beginning of the game, seeming to mesh well with all the contestants and was not seen as a physical liability. Although Wesson caused the Ogakor tribe to lose the second immunity challenge, her alliance with Amber Brkich, Colby Donaldson, Jerri Manthey and Mitchell Olson voted out Kel Gleason and Maralyn "Mad Dog" Hershey. The next time they lost immunity, Wesson managed to convince Donaldson and Keith Famie to force a tie between Olson (who was aligned with Brkich and Manthey) and Famie, whereby Mitchell would be voted off due to having a prior vote cast against him. Wesson and the four remaining Ogakors all made the merge.

With six contestants left, the main faction of the now Ogakor four joined Rodger Bingham and Elisabeth Filarski to vote out Manthey's old ally Brkich. Donaldson and Famie eliminated Bingham and then Filarski at the next two tribal councils. In the final immunity challenge, Donaldson continued his winning streak and ultimately chose to sit next to Wesson at the final Tribal Council instead of the more hated Famie. Wesson became the first female Sole Survivor in a 4–3 vote, in which she gained the votes of Famie, Filarski, Manthey, and Alicia Calloway. At the time, Wesson was aged 40; thus she held the title of oldest female Survivor winner for 11 years (23 seasons, ten female winners) until Denise Stapley, aged 41, won Survivor: Philippines in 2012.

All-Stars

She returned to the game for its All-Stars  season. As part of the Saboga tribe who lost the first immunity, Wesson was immediately targeted for being a past winner. On Day Three, Wesson became the first player voted out.  She finished in 18th place.

Blood vs. Water

Wesson played the game for a third time on the show's 27th season, Survivor: Blood vs. Water, alongside her daughter Katie Collins, who previously appeared in the loved ones challenge on The Australian Outback. Wesson was originally placed on the Galang tribe, which won four out of five immunity challenges over the Tadhana tribe, and she was initially in the majority alliance. After the merge, Wesson was voted out due to not being in the majority alliance and consistently competed on Redemption Island for a chance to re-enter the game. After competing in every Redemption Island duel post-merge, she won the final duel and returned to the game, beating Laura Morett and Hayden Moss, but was later voted out on day 38, becoming the eighth and final member of the jury, where she cast her vote for the eventual winner, Tyson Apostol.

Additional television appearances

In 2016, Wesson appeared in a special episode of The Price Is Right which featured multiple former Survivor contestants competing on the show. The episode aired on May 23, 2016.

Bibliography

Filmography

Television

References

External links
 Official website

 Tina Wesson biography for Survivor: All-Stars at CBS.com
 Tina Wesson and Katie Collins for Survivor: Blood vs. Water at CBS.com

1961 births
American nurses
American women nurses
Living people
Participants in American reality television series
People from Knoxville, Tennessee
Survivor (American TV series) winners
21st-century American women
Winners in the Survivor franchise